Pudukkottai taluk is a taluk of Pudukkottai district of the Indian state of Tamil Nadu. The headquarters of the taluk is the town of Pudukkottai

Demographics
According to the 2011 census, the taluk of Pudukkottai had a population of 229,294 with 114,431 males and 114,863 females. There were 1,004 women for every 1,000 men. The taluk had a literacy rate of 76.93%. Child population in the age group below 6 years were 11,406 Males and 10,860 Females.

Villages
There are twenty-seven panchayat villages in Pudukkottai Taluk:

References 

Taluks of Pudukkottai district